Kamila Ali aga gizi Aliyeva (born 8 June 1967) is an Azerbaijani politician.

She was first elected to the Parliament of Azerbaijan at the 2010 parliamentary election.

References 

1967 births
Living people
21st-century Azerbaijani women politicians
21st-century Azerbaijani politicians
Members of the National Assembly (Azerbaijan)
Women members of the National Assembly (Azerbaijan)